The Battle of Zakho was a battle fought during the 1991 uprisings in Iraq following the Gulf War. Zakho, a Kurdish city of over 50,000 population. People in the Zakho district of Duhok Governorate attacked the military bases and stormed government buildings on 13 March, took control of the town and inflicted heavy damage on government forces. The town fell to government forces on 1 April, and on 21 of April Coalition forces controlled the city.

References

Uprising In Zakho
Zakho
April 1991 events in Asia
Kurdish rebellions in Iraq
March 1991 events in Asia
Zakho